Hell's Kitchen is the ninth album by rapper, Andre Nickatina. It was released on January 15, 2002 for Million Dollar Dream and was produced by Andre Nickatina, Nick Peace, Juilan Piccolo, Smoov-E, Reggie Smith and Black Diamond. Hell's Kitchen was a compilation album and featured a large amount of talent including Mac Dre, San Quinn, Saafir and Nickatina's I.M.P bandmate, Cougnut.

Track listing
"Ayo"- 3:27  
"Alligator Blood"- 3:30  
"Business Brain"- 4:32  
"But Not Me"- 4:07  
"All Star Chuck Taylors"- 3:42  
"Clipboard Full of Game"- 3:43  
"Couger"- 2:39  
"Reel Drama"- 3:15  
"State 2 State"- 3:30  
"Cadillac Girl"- 4:08  
"July the 4th"- 4:01  
"Thugalinium"- 3:41  
"He Said, She Said"- 4:17  
"Super Greedy"- 5:05  
"L' Eveil"- 3:29  
"Hell's Kitchen"- 4:44

References

Andre Nickatina albums
2002 compilation albums